Georges Guillier (21 August 1920 – 14 August 1983) was a French racing cyclist. He rode in the 1949 Tour de France.

References

External links

1920 births
1983 deaths
French male cyclists
Cyclists from Paris